Francis Thomas Ament (November 17, 1937 - March 10, 2014) was the fourth Milwaukee County Executive, serving from 1992 until his resignation in 2002 amid a county pension scandal. Ament had served as chairman of the Milwaukee County Board of Supervisors from 1976 to 1992.

Life 

He graduated from Marquette University High School in 1955, earned his bachelor's degree from Marquette University in 1959 and his law degree from the Marquette University Law School in 1962. He was elected to the Milwaukee County Board of Supervisors. He was selected as board chairman in 1976, and stayed on the board until he defeated Joseph Czarnezki to become county executive in 1992, replacing one-term legislator Dave Schultz. After a scandal over pensions for county employees, an effort was mounted by conservative special interest group Citizens for Responsible Government in early 2002 to recall Ament. The group collected over 100,000 petition signatures to force a recall election.

On February 21, 2002, Ament announced his retirement effective February 26 at a Milwaukee County Board meeting. By retiring instead of resigning, Ament remained eligible to claim his own pension. He was replaced by former Wisconsin Supreme Court Justice Janine Geske on an interim basis and by state Representative Scott Walker, a Republican, following a special election.

References

1937 births
2014 deaths
County supervisors in Wisconsin
Marquette University alumni
Marquette University Law School alumni
Milwaukee County Executives
Politicians from Milwaukee
Wisconsin Democrats